Gerardo Chijona Valdés (born in Havana on 1949) is a Cuban film director and critic. Among his best known films is Ticket to Paradise. Although other films he is known for include Adorable Lies or Adorables mentiras, Un paraíso bajo las estrellas, and Perfecto amor equivocado. He initially directed documentary films.

References

External links 
 Bio and filmography of Gerardo Chijona on the official website of Ticket to Paradise

Documentary film directors
People from Havana
1949 births
Living people
Cuban documentary filmmakers